The 2012–13 NCAA Division I men's basketball season began in November with the 2K Sports Classic and ended with the Final Four in Atlanta, April 6–8.

Season headlines
October 29 – The AP preseason All-American team was named. Indiana's Cody Zeller was the leading vote-getter, garnering 64 of 65 possible votes. Joining Zeller were Creighton forward Doug McDermott (62 votes), Murray State guard Isaiah Canaan (43), Ohio State forward Deshaun Thomas (26), Michigan guard Trey Burke (16) and Lehigh guard CJ McCollum (16). Burke and McCollum tied in the voting, creating a sixth spot on the team.
December 1 – Respected Saint Louis coach Rick Majerus died at 64 of heart failure. Majerus had been placed on a medical leave of absence prior to the start of the season for medical reasons and was replaced on an interim basis by Jim Crews. Majerus had a record of 517–216 in his 25 years as a head coach, with stops at Marquette, Ball State and Utah prior to taking the job at SLU. His best finish came in 1998 when he led Utah to the NCAA championship game.
December 15 – The seven Big East Conference schools that do not sponsor FBS football (DePaul, Georgetown, St. John's, Providence, Villanova, Seton Hall and Marquette, collectively called the "Catholic 7") announced that they would break from the Big East and pursue other conference affiliation. The move leaves Connecticut as the only original Big East member set to remain in the conference.
 February 28 – ESPN reports that the "Catholic 7" will launch their new conference in July 2013, two years ahead of schedule, and will purchase the rights to the "Big East" name from the remaining conference schools. Two Atlantic 10 Conference members, Butler (which had only joined the A10 in July 2012) and Xavier, will reportedly join the new Big East, with Missouri Valley Conference member Creighton also a possibility.
 March 8 – The Big East split is officially announced. As previously reported, the "Catholic 7" will leave on June 30 with the Big East name. As of the announcement, the "Catholic 7" were the only members of the new Big East, but Butler, Xavier, and Creighton are expected to be added shortly.
 March 12 – Virginia Tech's Erick Green wins the ACC Player of the Year award, joining Maryland's Len Bias (1985–86) as the only two players of the year who competed for teams with losing ACC records.
 March 20 – The new Big East is officially launched at a press conference in New York City, with Butler, Creighton, and Xavier joining the "Catholic 7".
 April 3 – The FBS schools that will retain the charter of the original Big East unveil their future name, American Athletic Conference.

Milestones and records
 November 25 – Lehigh's CJ McCollum scored 26 points in a 91–77 win over Sacred Heart, which made him surpass Rob Feaster as the Patriot League's all-time leading scorer.
 December 8 – Junior center Jordan Bachynski recorded the first triple-double in Arizona State men's basketball history. The 7'2" Bachynski scored 13 points, grabbed 12 rebounds and blocked 12 shots in an 87–76 win over Cal State Northridge.
 December 17 – Syracuse head coach Jim Boeheim became the third Division I head coach to win 900 games as the Orange defeated Detroit 72–68.
 December 19 – Phil Pressey recorded 19 assists for Missouri against UCLA tying the Southeastern Conference single-game assist record (Kenny Higgs, ; Bill Hann).
 January 2 – VCU senior guard Troy Daniels set a school and Atlantic 10 Conference record by hitting 11 three-pointers in a 109–58 win over East Tennessee State. Daniels scored all 33 of his points in the game on three-point shots.
 Santa Clara guard Kevin Foster, South Dakota State guard Nate Wolters, Evansville guard Colt Ryan, Georgia Southern guard C. J. Reed, Creighton forward Doug McDermott, VMI forward Stan Okoye, Sacred Heart guard Shane Gibson, Ohio guard D. J. Cooper, Murray State guard Isaiah Canaan, Duke guard Seth Curry, Bucknell center Mike Muscala and Florida guard Kenny Boynton each passed the 2,000 point mark for their careers.
 January 26 – Northern Illinois set several all-time Division I marks of offensive futility in a 42–25 loss to Eastern Michigan: fewest points in a half in the shot clock era (4), lowest field goal shooting percentage for a half (3.2%), and tied the record for fewest field goals made in a half (1). The Huskies shot 1-for-31 in the first half, including 29 straight misses.
 February 25 – Kansas head coach Bill Self records his 500th win with a 108–96 overtime win at Iowa State.
 March 5 – D. J. Cooper of Ohio becomes the first player in the history of college basketball to record 2,000 points, 900 assists, 600 rebounds and 300 steals in a career.
 March 13 – Grambling State loses 59–51 to Alabama A&M in the SWAC tournament, finishing off their winless 0–28 season.

Conference membership changes

The 2012–13 season saw the second wave of membership changes resulting from a major realignment of NCAA Division I conferences. The cycle began in 2010 with the Big Ten and the then-Pac-10 publicly announcing their intentions to expand. The fallout from these conferences' moves later affected a majority of D-I conferences.

In addition, one school moved from Division II starting this season. This school was ineligible for NCAA-sponsored postseason play until completing its D-I transition in 2016. Finally, one school that had announced a transition to Division II, New Orleans, announced that it would halt its transition and remain in Division I.

New arenas
Coastal Carolina left behind one of the smallest venues in Division I basketball, Kimbel Arena (seating little over 1,000). The Chanticleers remained on campus at the new HTC Center.
Troy left its on-campus home since 1962, the original Trojan Arena, for a new on-campus venue also named Trojan Arena.

Major rule changes
Beginning in 2012–13, the following rules changes were implemented:
College coaches are allowed to practice with players a maximum two hours per week during the Summer (May–August) as long as the student-athletes were enrolled in classes.
Coaches could work their teams for a maximum of two hours a week beginning September 15 until official practice begins on October 13.
There is now unlimited contact, including text messaging, allowed between college coaches and a prospective player in high school and junior college recruiting.

Season outlook

Pre-season polls

The top 25 from the AP and ESPN/USA Today Coaches Polls.

Regular season
A number of early-season tournaments will mark the beginning of the college basketball season.

Early-season tournaments

*Although these tournaments include more teams, only the number listed play for the championship.

Conference winners and tournaments
Thirty athletic conferences each end their regular seasons with a single-elimination tournament. The teams in each conference that win their regular season title are given the number one seed in each tournament. The winners of these tournaments receive automatic invitations to the 2013 NCAA Men's Division I Basketball Tournament. The Ivy League does not have a conference tournament, instead giving their automatic invitation to their regular season champion. As of 2013, the Great West Conference does not have an automatic bid to the NCAA Men or Women's College Tournament but the men's tourney champion does receive an automatic bid to the CollegeInsider.com Postseason Tournament.

Statistical leaders

Conference standings

Postseason tournaments

NCAA tournament

Final Four – Georgia Dome, Atlanta, Georgia

Tournament upsets
For this list, a "major upset" is defined as a win by a team seeded 7 or more spots below its defeated opponent.

National Invitation tournament

After the NCAA tournament field is announced, the NCAA invited 32 teams to participate in the National Invitation Tournament. The tournament will begin on March 19, 2013, with all games prior to the semifinals played on campus sites. The semifinals and final will be respectively held on April 2 and April 4, 2013 at the traditional site of Madison Square Garden.

NIT Semifinals and Final
Played at Madison Square Garden in New York City

College Basketball Invitational

The fifth College Basketball Invitational (CBI) Tournament began on March 19, 2013 and ended with a best-of-three final scheduled for April 1, 3, and 5; the final went the full three games. This tournament featured 16 teams who were left out of the NCAA tournament and NIT.

CollegeInsider.com Postseason tournament

The fourth CollegeInsider.com Postseason Tournament was held beginning March 2013 and ending with a championship game in April 2013. This tournament places an emphasis on selecting successful teams from "mid-major" conferences who were left out of the NCAA tournament and NIT. 32 teams participated in this tournament, which granted an automatic bid to the Great West Conference men's basketball tournament champion.

Award winners

Consensus All-American teams

The following players are recognized as the 2013 Consensus All-Americans:

Major player of the year awards
Wooden Award: Trey Burke, Michigan
Naismith Award: Trey Burke, Michigan
Associated Press Player of the Year: Trey Burke, Michigan
NABC Player of the Year: Trey Burke, Michigan
Oscar Robertson Trophy (USBWA): Trey Burke, Michigan
Sporting News Player of the Year: Victor Oladipo, Indiana

Major freshman of the year awards
Wayman Tisdale Award (USBWA): Marcus Smart, Oklahoma State
Sporting News Freshman of the Year: Marcus Smart, Oklahoma State

Major coach of the year awards
Associated Press Coach of the Year: Jim Larrañaga, Miami (Florida)
Henry Iba Award (USBWA): Jim Larrañaga, Miami (Florida)
NABC Coach of the Year: Jim Crews, Saint Louis
Naismith College Coach of the Year: Jim Larrañaga, Miami (Florida)
 Sporting News Coach of the Year: Jim Crews, Saint Louis

Other major awards
Bob Cousy Award (Best point guard): Trey Burke, Michigan
Pete Newell Big Man Award (Best big man): Mason Plumlee, Duke
NABC Defensive Player of the Year: Victor Oladipo, Indiana & Jeff Withey, Kansas
Frances Pomeroy Naismith Award (Best senior 6'0"/1.83 m or shorter): Peyton Siva, Louisville
Senior CLASS Award (top senior): Jordan Hulls, Indiana
Robert V. Geasey Trophy (Top player in Philadelphia Big 5): Khalif Wyatt, Temple
Haggerty Award (Top player in New York City metro area): Lamont Jones, Iona
Ben Jobe Award (Top minority coach): Kevin Ollie, Connecticut
Hugh Durham Award (Top mid-major coach): Danny Kaspar, Stephen F. Austin
Jim Phelan Award (Top head coach): Dana Altman, Oregon
Lefty Driesell Award (Top defensive player): Tommy Brenton, Stony Brook
Lou Henson Award (Top mid-major player): Matthew Dellavedova, Saint Mary's
Lute Olson Award (Top non-freshman or transfer player): Shane Larkin, Miami (Florida)
Skip Prosser Man of the Year Award (Coach with moral character): Joe Mihalich, Niagara
Academic All-American of the Year (Top scholar-athlete): Aaron Craft, Ohio State
Elite 89 Award (Top GPA among upperclass players at Final Four): Wayne Blackshear, Louisville

Coaching changes
A number of teams changed coaches during and after the season.

References